Cameron O'Donnell (born 29 September 2001) is a Scottish professional footballer who plays as a midfielder for Scottish Championship club Alloa Athletic.

Career statistics

References

Living people
2001 births
Scottish footballers
Association football midfielders
Place of birth missing (living people)
Alloa Athletic F.C. players
Scottish Professional Football League players